The 2008 Atlantic Championship season was the thirty-fifth Atlantic Championship season. It began on April 20, 2008 and ended on October 4, 2008. Despite the merger of Champ Car's premier series with the Indy Racing League, the Champ Car owners continued to own and operate the Atlantic Championship under a new legal entity, Atlantic Racing Series, LLC. Champ Car continued to sanction the first two events of the season at Long Beach and Laguna Seca with the remainder of the season running under IMSA sanction. The Cooper Tires Presents the Atlantic Championship Powered by Mazda Drivers' Champion was Markus Niemelä driving for Brooks Associates Racing.

Events
The original 12-race 2008 Atlantic Championship calendar, which featured many supporting runs during Champ Car World Series events, had to be scrapped as a result of the 2008 open-wheel reunification announcement. The Long Beach, Laguna Seca, Edmonton, Mont-Tremblant and Road America races, which had been part of the Champ Car schedule before reunification, remained in the calendar. The Road America races were changed, as the American Le Mans Series' Generac 500 weekend meet was changed from one to two races (a Saturday and Sunday race). The Edmonton race, now part of the IndyCar Series, also switched to a two-race format. The original races at Trois-Rivieres and Miller were not affected, since the Quebec race was part of the Grand Prix of Trois-Rivieres (which also features the NASCAR Canadian Tire Series), and the Utah race was conducted as part of the Rolex Sports Car Series Sunchaser 1000 weekend. On April 3 a revised post-reunification schedule was released featuring 11 races including the seven weekends that were kept (with two races at Edmonton and Road America), and two new races, one at New Jersey and a second Road Atlanta (as a support race to the Petit Le Mans).

Television
The 2008 series was televised at 5 PM ET on Sundays starting on November 9, 2008 on Speed TV.

 November 9 – Grand Prix of Long Beach
 November 16 – Laguna Seca and Race 1 of Edmonton
 December 14 – Race 2 of Edmonton and Race 1 of Road America
 December 21 – Race 2 of Road America and Trois Rivières
 December 28 – Miller Motorsports Park and Road Atlanta

Drivers and Teams
The following teams and drivers competed in the 2008 Atlantic Championship season.  All teams used the Swift 016.a chassis powered by a Mazda-Cosworth MZR 2.3 liter inline-4 engine and Cooper tires.

Full series results

Race summaries

Round 1: Imperial Capital Bank Atlantic Challenge of Long Beach
 Sunday April 20, 2008 -  1:30 p.m. EDT
 Streets of Long Beach - Long Beach, California (1.968 mile street circuit)
 Time: 50 minutes
 Distance: 38 laps / 74.784 miles
 Race weather: 60 °F, Sunny skies
 Television: Speed (November 9, 2008 - 5:00 p.m. EST)
 Pole position winner: #26 Jonathan Bomarito, 93.286 mph (150.125 km/h)
 Race Summary
The 2008 Imperial Capital Bank Atlantic Challenge of Long Beach was won by the young Swiss driver Simona de Silvestro making her only the second female driver to ever win an Atlantic Championship race after Katherine Legge.

Round 2: Monterey Festival of Speed Atlantic Championship
 Sunday May 18, 2008 - 4:00 p.m. EDT
 Mazda Raceway Laguna Seca - Monterey, California
 Time: 50 minutes
 Distance:  34 laps / 76.092 miles
 Race weather: 89 °F, sunny skies
 Television: Speed (November 16, 2008 - 5:00 p.m. EST)
 Pole position winner: #3 James Hinchcliffe, 1:16.189 (105.748 mph)
 Race Summary
Canadian James Hinchciffe took the pole at Laguna Seca with a 1:16.189 which was a track record qualifying run on by an Atlantic car on Saturday after taking the provisional pole on Friday. He then went on to dominate Sunday's race.

Round 3: Sommet des Legends
 Sunday June 29, 2008 -  1:00 p.m. EDT
 Circuit Mont-Tremblant - Mont-Tremblant, Quebec (2.621 mile road circuit)
 Time: 50 minutes
 Distance: 30 laps / 78.630 miles
 Race weather: 75 °F, Partly cloudy skies
 Television: TBA
 Pole position winner: #6 Junior Strous, 1:28.805 (106.251 mph)
 Race Summary
Dutch driver Junior Strous dominated the weekend by taking pole and leading every lap in the race.  The win was his first ever in the Atlantic Championship, as was his pole position.  He leads the season championship with 74 points over James Hinchcliffe and Markus Niemelä who are tied at 67.

Round 4: Rexall Edmonton Indy Twin Races - Race 1
 Friday July 25, 2008 -  5:15 p.m. MDT
 Rexall Speedway - Edmonton, Alberta (1.973 mile temporary airport circuit)
 Time: 50 minutes
 Distance: 38 laps / 74.974 miles
 Race weather: 80 °F, Partly cloudy skies
 Television: Speed (November 16, 2008 - 5:30 p.m. EST)
 Pole position winner: #3 James Hinchcliffe,  1:05.910 (107.765 mph)
 Race Summary
Polesitter James Hinchcliffe led from the green flag but was closely stalked by Jonathan Bomarito, who finally made the pass in Turn 1 on lap 31.  A late race caution set up a one lap sprint to the finish with Bomarito holding off Markus Niemelä to become the fourth race winner in as many races this season.  The win was Bomarito's third Atlantic victory and the first victory for his team, Mathiasen Motorsports, in 36 starts.  In the points chase, Niemelä leads Hinchcliffe 94-93.

Round 5: Rexall Edmonton Indy Twin Races - Race 2
 Saturday July 25, 2008 -  12:45 p.m. MDT
 Rexall Speedway - Edmonton, Alberta (1.973 mile temporary airport circuit)
 Time: 50 minutes
 Distance: 36 laps / 71.028 miles
 Race weather: 80 °F, Mostly cloudy skies
 Television: Speed (December 14, 2008 - 5:00 p.m. EST)
 Pole position winner: #14 Carl Skerlong,  1:05.455 (108.514 mph)
 Race Summary
A1 Grand Prix veteran (but Atlantic rookie) Jonathan Summerton jumped into the lead from third on the starting grid and dominated the race, leading every lap on the way to his first Atlantic series win.  He became the fifth different winner in five races and the first rookie to top a podium this year.  James Hinchcliffe finished third and jumped to the top of the points table.  He has 118 points, five more than Markus Niemelä.

Round 6: Road Race Showcase/Road America - Race 1
 Saturday August 8, 2008 -  1:00 p.m. CDT
 Road America - Elkhart Lake, Wisconsin (4.048 mile permanent road circuit)
 Time: 50 minutes
 Distance: 18 laps / 72.864 miles
 Race weather: 76 °F, Partly cloudy skies
 Television: Speed (December 14, 2008 - 5:30 p.m. EST)
 Pole position winner: #19 Dane Cameron,  1:59.190 (122.265 mph)
 Race Summary
Jonathan Bomarito became the first multiple time winner in the 2008 Atlantic series.  He took the lead from pole sitter Dane Cameron at the standing start.  On lap 10, Cameron passed Bomarito in Canada Corner but Bomarito was able to pass him back on the following lap, taking the lead which he would hold for the remainder of the race.  James Hinchcliffe finished fifth, high enough to keep the points lead with 139 points.  Markus Niemelä trails Hinchcliffe by 7 and Bomarito is only 9 points back.  Atlantic and Champ Car veteran Tõnis Kasemets made his first appearance since last year's Atlantic round at Road America and finished on the podium in third.

Round 7: Road Race Showcase/Road America - Race 2
 Sunday August 9, 2008 -  1:30 p.m. CDT
 Road America - Elkhart Lake, Wisconsin (4.048 mile permanent road circuit)
 Time: 50 minutes
 Distance: 20 laps / 80.960 miles
 Race weather: 75 °F, Partly cloudy skies
 Television: Speed (December 21, 2008 - 5:00 p.m. EST)
 Pole position winner: #26 Jonathan Bomarito,  1:59.564 (121.883 mph)
 Race Summary
Race 1's winner Jonathan Bomarito led away from the pole, while behind him Jonathan Summerton was charging up through the field from ninth place on the grid.  On lap 18, Summerton passed Bomarito in Turn 1, leading only the final two laps home to the checkered flag.  Even with the second place finish Bomarito jumped to the top of the points chase.  He leads with 157, three in front of the previous leader James Hinchcliffe and six in front of Markus Niemelä.

Round 8: Grand Prix de Trois-Rivières
 Sunday August 17, 2008 -  1:30 p.m. EDT
 Circuit Trois-Rivières - Trois-Rivières, Quebec (1.521 mile temporary street circuit)
 Time: 50 minutes
 Distance: 44 laps / 66.924 miles
 Race weather: 70 °F, Clear
 Television: Speed (December 21, 2008 - 5:30 p.m. EST)
 Pole position winner: #26 Jonathan Bomarito,  58.989 (92.824 mph)
 Race Summary
Jonathan Bomarito led away from the standing start and was never seriously challenged on his way to his third Atlantic victory of the year.  Bad days for James Hinchcliffe and Markus Niemelä allowed him to open a sizable lead in the season championship going into the final three races of the year.  Bomarito leads the championship with 191, 28 points ahead of Jonathan Summerton who has 163.  Hinchcliffe is still in third, but is 36 points back with 155.

Round 9: Mazda Formula Zoom Zoom
 Sunday September 14, 2008 -  1:00 p.m. EDT
 New Jersey Motorsports Park - Millville, New Jersey (2.177 mile permanent road circuit)
 Time: 50 minutes
 Distance: 42 laps / 91.434 miles
 Race weather: 86 °F, Clear
 Television: TBA
 Pole position winner: #14 Carl Skerlong,  1:10.211 (111.624 mph)
 Race Summary
Carl Skerlong dominated the weekend, leading every session and leading every lap in the race to claim his first Atlantic victory.  He even set the fastest lap, giving him a perfect score of 34 points for the weekend.  Points leader Jonathan Bomarito finished ninth, which reduced his margin to 16 points over Jonathan Summerton and 22 over Markus Niemelä with two races left in the season.

Round 10: SunRichGourmet.com 1000
 Sunday September 21, 2008 -  2:30 p.m. MDT
 Miller Motorsports Park - Tooele, Utah (4.486 mile permanent road circuit)
 Time: 50 minutes
 Distance: 20 laps / 89.720 miles
 Race weather: 71 °F, Mostly Cloudy
 Television: Speed (December 28, 2008 - 5:00 p.m. EST)
 Pole position winner: #8 Markus Niemelä,  2:28.915 (108.448 mph)
 Race Summary
Markus Niemelä followed up his first Atlantic series pole position with his first series victory, leading every lap in the race.  Three drivers are still alive for the series championship going into the final round of the season.  Jonathan Bomarito, who finished sixth, now leads with 224 points.  He has an eight point advantage over Jonathan Summerton and a 10 point lead over Niemelä.

Round 11: Atlanta Atlantic Challenge
 Friday October 3, 2008 -  2:10 p.m. EDT
 Road Atlanta - Braselton, Georgia (2.540 mile permanent road circuit)
 Time: 50 minutes
 Distance: 35 laps / 88.900 miles
 Race weather: 72 °F, Clear
 Television: Speed (December 28, 2008 - 5:30 p.m. EST)
 Pole position winner: #36 Jonathan Summerton,  1:14.137 (123.339 mph)
 Race Summary
Markus Niemelä won the race and clinched the series championship on an eventful day at Road Atlanta.  At the start Dane Cameron took the race lead from the standing start while Niemelä got around the pole sitter Jonathan Summerton for second place.  Jonathan Bomarito, the points leader going into the race, dropped out of the race with mechanical troubles after only 10 laps.  Going into a restart on lap 33, Niemelä was in second and Summerton was in third, but Summerton was in line to clinch the championship.  On the restart, Niemelä got around Cameron to take the lead on the track and Kevin Lacroix passed Summerton for third, which put Niemelä in position to take the championship.  Summerton attempted to pass Cameron to put himself back into the championship position but they made contact and both cars were knocked out of the race.  Niemelä cruised the final laps under yellow.  Niemelä finished the season with 245 points followed by Bomarito at 228 and Summerton with 224.

Final driver results

Points system

Bonus Points
 1 point to fastest driver in a qualification session.
 1 point to driver who leads the most laps in the race.
 1 point to driver who improves the most positions in the race.

Driver results and standings

See also
 2008 Champ Car season (cancelled)
 2008 Indianapolis 500
 2008 IndyCar Series season
 2008 Indy Lights season

References

External links
 ChampCarStats.com

Atlantic Championship 2008
Atlantic Championship 2008
Atlantic Championship seasons
Atlantic Championship